At the 2009 Mediterranean Games, the athletics events were held in Pescara, Italy from 30 June to 3 July.

Medal summary

Men

Women

Disability athletics

Games records

Medal table

Participating nations

 (2)
 (8)
 (5)
 (11)
 (20)
 (5)
 (53)
 (65)
 (63)
 (11)
 (1)
 (2)
 (4)
 (31)
 (2)
 (10)
 (12)
 (24)
 (2)
 (13)
 (28)

Notes
 Italian triple jumper Magdelín Martínez was second in the contest with a jump of 14.16 m according to the competition results, but she is not listed among the medalists, while Papachristou of Greece (who finished fourth) is credited with the bronze medal. As it was proven, the jump of Martinez was not 14.16 m, but 14.11 m. The mistake was caused by the automatic measure machine, which stuck after Nzola's last jump (14.16). The bronze medal was finally appointed to Papachristou.

References

Official results reports. Mediterranean Games. Retrieved on 2009-07-13.
Sampaolo, Diego (2009-07-01). Abeylegesse runs 31:58.98; good day for hosts too – Mediterranean Games, Day 1. IAAF. Retrieved on 2009-07-02.
Sampaolo, Diego (2009-07-02). High Jump and Discus Throw provide best results – Mediterranean Games, Day 2. IAAF. Retrieved on 2009-07-02.
Sampaolo, Diego (2009-07-02). A good day for hosts and Morocco – Mediterranean Games, Day 3. IAAF. Retrieved on 2009-07-11.
Sampaolo, Diego (2009-07-04). Cusma double; Sdiri shows solid form again, 8.29m – Mediterranean Games, Day 4. IAAF. Retrieved on 2009-07-12.
Official athletics medal table. Mediterranean Games. Retrieved on 2009-07-13.

External links
 Official results

Mediterranean
Athletics
2009
Mediterranean Games 2009